Hans Håkansson (9 September 1908, Malmö - 1993) was a Swedish footballer.

Career
Håkansson played for Malmö FF for almost his entire career. He still holds the record for most goals scored in total with 341 goals. After his career in Malmö he moved to Uddevalla to work as a journalist and to play football. He was a prolific goalscorer, scoring 30 goals in 18 games during the 1935/36 season Håkansson .

References

1908 births
1993 deaths
Swedish footballers
Malmö FF players
Allsvenskan players
Footballers from Malmö
Association football forwards